Live in London is a live album by American rock band the Beach Boys released by EMI in the UK in May 1970. When released in the US on November 15, 1976, the album was renamed Beach Boys '69 (The Beach Boys In London) via Capitol Records.

Background
1968 was a difficult year for The Beach Boys in the USA, where their reputation had soured considerably. Yet enthusiasm for the group in Europe was still strong, as evidenced by these confident performances recorded while the group were making their 20/20 album.  After the surprise success of the Endless Summer and Spirit of America hits packages in 1974 and 1975, the Beach Boys enjoyed a resurgence of popularity in America, especially on the concert circuit. It was during this time that Capitol decided to issue a renamed edition of the album for the first time in the US. The reissue had art by rock artist Jim Evans, and a new title, Beach Boys '69.  Besides the fact that the live performance was actually recorded in December 1968, the LP's appearance added confusion to the marketplace as the group had recently issued a new, live double album—The Beach Boys in Concert—on their own Brother Records label, as part of a distribution deal with their new label, Reprise.  Despite this, the record became a small chart success in the US, following the Top 10 placing of 15 Big Ones, reaching #75 in the Fall of 1976 during a US chart stay of 10 weeks.  The UK edition failed to chart.

Beach Boys observers believe that the group owed Capitol one more album (this may have been offered to fill such a role, instead of the Fading Rock Group Revival/Reverberation project), and so, this release ended their relationship with that record label, as well as with EMI in the UK.  When their albums were remastered for CD in 1990 (and again in 2001), Live in London was paired with their 1964 live release Beach Boys Concert.

Track listing
All tracks written by Brian Wilson and Mike Love, unless otherwise noted.

Side one
"Darlin'" – 2:41
"Wouldn't It Be Nice" (Brian Wilson, Tony Asher, Mike Love) – 1:53
"Sloop John B" (Traditional; arranged by Brian Wilson) – 2:30
"California Girls" – 2:19
"Do It Again" – 2:47
"Wake the World" (Brian Wilson, Al Jardine) – 2:26
"Aren't You Glad" – 3:09
Side two
"Bluebirds Over the Mountain" (Ersel Hickey) – 2:53
"Their Hearts Were Full of Spring" (Bobby Troup) – 2:49
"Good Vibrations" – 4:36
"God Only Knows" (Brian Wilson, Tony Asher) – 3:27
"Barbara Ann" (Fred Fassert) – 2:32

In 1990, Live in London was paired on CD with Beach Boys Concert, featuring two live bonus tracks from 1964 ("Don't Worry Baby") and 1967 ("Heroes And Villains").
The live version of "Good Vibrations" featured here was used as a B-side to “Rock 'n' Roll to the Rescue” and was also included in the game Rock Band 3.

Personnel
The Beach Boys
Mike Love - vocals, tambourine, electro-theremin on “Good Vibrations”
Carl Wilson - vocals, lead guitar
Al Jardine - vocals, rhythm guitar
Dennis Wilson - vocals, drums
Bruce Johnston - vocals, bass, organ

Additional personnel
Daryl Dragon – piano, organ, bass on "Bluebirds Over the Mountain"
Ed Carter - bass, tambourine, lead guitar on "Bluebirds Over the Mountain"
Mike Kowalski - percussion
Uncredited horns and possible cellos

Sources
Surf's Up: The Beach Boys On Record Brad Elliott c. 1981
Beach Boys Concert/Live in London CD booklet notes, David Leaf, c. 1990.
Allmusic

References

1970 live albums
The Beach Boys live albums
Capitol Records live albums
Albums produced by Brian Wilson